Qaleh-ye Hoseyniyeh (also Romanized as Qal‘eh-ye Ḩoseynīyeh) is a village in Khorramdarreh Rural District, in the Central District of Khorramdarreh County, Zanjan Province, Iran. At the 2006 census, its population was 1,963, in 490 families.

References 

Populated places in Khorramdarreh County